Kirby Buckets, also known as Kirby Buckets Warped in the third season, is an American comedy television series that aired on Disney XD from October 20, 2014 to February 2, 2017. Although a live-action series, the series also includes animated cartoon sequences of Kirby's drawings. The series stars Jacob Bertrand, Olivia Stuck, Mekai Curtis, Cade Sutton, and Tiffany Espensen.

Plot 
Kirby Buckets dreams of becoming a famous animator like his idol, Mac McCallister, and interacts with his cartoon creations. Similar to Nicholas Martin in McGee and Me!, Kirby sees his drawings take shape as he and his two best friends, Fish and Eli, go on outrageous and unpredictable adventures.

In the third season, Kirby is sued by Dawn and forbidden from drawing ever again. During a trip to the principal's office he finds a small orb device which allows him to travel to alternate realities. Using it, Kirby accidentally sends his parents to an alternate dimension, and picks up their counterparts from a Mad Max-like universe. Now Kirby must find his parents, while having a little fun along the way.

Episodes

Cast and characters

Main 
 Jacob Bertrand as Kirby Buckets, a boy who dreams of becoming a famous animator
 Olivia Stuck as Dawn Buckets, Kirby's older sister who dislikes Kirby’s drawings of her.
 Mekai Curtis as Fish, Kirby's best friend alongside Eli.
 Cade Sutton as Eli, Kirby's best friend alongside Fish.
 Tiffany Espensen as Belinda, Dawn's best friend.

Recurring 
 Suzi Barrett as Mom, Kirby's mother
 Michael Naughton as Dad, Kirby's father.
 Stephen Kearin as Principal Mitchell, the principal at Kirby's school.
 Jack Foley as Big Ricky, a student at Kirby's school.

Production 
Disney XD first developed and piloted Kirby Buckets in 2012 with producers Gabe Snyder and Mike Alber, David Bowers, and Kristofor Brown. Kirby Buckets was picked up as a series in February 2014. Production started in summer 2014 set for a fall 2014 premiere. On January 13, 2015, the series was renewed for a second season with production resuming in March. The second season premiered on October 7, 2015. On March 4, 2016, Disney XD renewed the series for a third season. The third season premiered on January 16, 2017.

Broadcast 
Kirby Buckets premiered on Disney XD in Australia on April 11, 2015, and in New Zealand on April 14, 2015.

Ratings 
 

| link2             = List of Kirby Buckets episodes#Season 2 (2015–16)
| episodes2         = 21
| start2            = 
| end2              = 
| startrating2      = 0.36
| endrating2        = 0.18
| viewers2          = |2}} 

| link3             = List of Kirby Buckets episodes#Season 3: Warped (2017)
| episodes3         = 12
| start3            = 
| end3              = 
| startrating3      = 0.14
| endrating3        = 0.16
| viewers3          = |2}} 
}}

References

External links 
 

2010s American children's comedy television series
2014 American television series debuts
2017 American television series endings
American television series with live action and animation
Disney XD original programming
English-language television shows
Television series about parallel universes